Mikhail Vladimirovich Kuznetsov (born 6 July 1988) is a Russian pair skater. With Ekaterina Sheremetieva, he is the 2007 ISU Junior Grand Prix Final silver medalist. With later partner Tatiana Novik, he placed fourth at the 2010 World Junior Championships and took bronze at the 2010 International Cup of Nice.

Career 
Kuznetsov teamed up with Ekaterina Sheremetieva in 2003.

Sheremetieva broke her foot in 2006 and, as a result, the pair missed most of the 2006–2007 season. Although they placed third on the day, Sheremetieva/Kuznetsov were later awarded the silver medal from the 2007–08 ISU Junior Grand Prix Final following the retroactive disqualification of Vera Bazarova / Yuri Larionov due to a positive doping sample from Larionov. Sheremetieva/Kuznetsov made their senior international debut at the 2008 Nebelhorn Trophy, placing 5th. They missed part of the 2008-2009 season due to injury. Their partnership ended following that season.

Kuznetsov teamed up with Tatiana Novik in spring 2009. They won the silver medal at the 2010 Russian Junior Championships and placed 4th at the 2010 World Junior Championships. They were coached by Nina Mozer in Moscow and split at the end of the 2010–11 season.

Programs

With Novik

With Sheremetieva

Competitive highlights

With Novik

With Sheremetieva

References

External links

 
 
 Ekaterina Sheremetieva / Mikhail Kuznetsov at Tracings.net

Russian male pair skaters
1988 births
Living people
Sportspeople from Chelyabinsk